President pro tempore (often shortened to pro tem) of the Texas Senate is a largely honorary position, and is third in the line for the governorship of Texas. If the governor and lieutenant governor are both out of the state, the president pro tem is acting governor in their absence.

At the beginning of each session, the Senate elects one member to serve as the president pro tempore when the lieutenant governor is absent or that office becomes vacant. A different member of the Senate (usually a senior member, but unlike in some bodies, it is not based on seniority) is elected at the end of the session to serve as president pro tempore during the interim when the state legislature is not in session.

Unlike his or her counterparts in other state senates, the president pro tempore does not preside over the chamber on a daily basis; Texas's lieutenant governor regularly exercises his or her constitutional post as president of the state senate.

Presidents pro tempore of the Texas Senate

References

 

 
Texas Senate
Lists of Texas politicians